World of Stupid is an American television series which aired on the Fox Reality network in the U.S., and on the Razer network in Canada. The show is seemingly inspired by the American television series Jackass. World of Stupid chronicles ten groups of people in 10 different cities performing often dangerous stunts and pranks.

The show has featured such stunt groups as The E-jets, formed in Rhyl, North Wales in the UK and The Dudesons of Finland.

References
Martin, Denise, "Fox expands world with reality formats", Variety, July 26, 2005 (URL last accessed October 3, 2006).
Razer, "Razer Fall '06 Highlights", Press Release, CNW Group, August 3, 2006 (URL last accessed September 30, 2006).

2000s American reality television series
American comedy television series
2006 American television series debuts
2006 American television series endings